Collie is a town in the South West region of Western Australia,  south of the state capital, Perth, and  inland from the regional city and port of Bunbury. It is near the junction of the Collie and Harris Rivers, in the middle of dense jarrah forest and the only coalfields in Western Australia. At the 2021 census, Collie had a population of 7,599.

Collie is mainly known as a coal-producing centre, but also offers industrial, agricultural and aquaculture tourism industries.  Muja Power Station is located east of the town, and to its west is the Wellington Dam, a popular location for fishing, swimming and boating.

The town is named after the river on which it is situated. James Stirling named the Collie River, which in turn is named after Alexander Collie. He and William Preston were the first Europeans to explore the area, in 1829.

It has been reported that coal was discovered in the area by a shepherd named George Marsh in the early 1880s. The townsite was surveyed and gazetted in 1897. The first coal mine opened in 1927.

Collie was once referred to as a "dirty mining town", but on 8 April 2006 it won the Australian Tidy Towns Competition from finalists from six states and the Northern Territory. Collie was named the top Tidy Town because of the commitment of the community to recycling, waste management, beautification and community projects.

Population
According to the 2021 census, there were 7,599 people in Collie.
 Aboriginal and Torres Strait Islander people made up 4.8% of the population. 
 81.0% of people were born in Australia. The next most common countries of birth were England 3.9% and New Zealand 2.1%.   
 89.0% of people spoke only English at home. 
 The most common responses for religion were No Religion 51.5%, Catholic 16.3% and Anglican 12.5%.

Industry and economy
Collie has a significant role in the provision of electricity for Western Australia. The state's two coal mines are in the town, and there are three power stations. The government of Western Australia will soon commission a new base load power station, for which a number of Collie base proposals have been made.

It contains enough reserves for another 30 years of mining at the present rate. The Griffin Coal mine is owned by the Indian company Lanco Infratech.

Education
Collie has five primary schools, Allanson Primary School, Fairview Primary School, Amaroo Primary School, Saint Brigid's Catholic College and Wilson Park Primary School and one high school, Collie Senior High School.

Tourism and facilities
Tourist attractions at Collie include the Steam Locomotive Museum, Collie Art Gallery, Minninup Pool and Wellington Dam. Parks include Soldier's Memorial Park and natural features include the Collie River. Stockton Lake, Lake Kepwari, Harris River Dam and Wellington Dam are man-made reservoirs and lakes available for leisure and recreation. Sporting facilities include the Roche Park Recreation Centre, Collie Hockey Grounds and the Collie Eagles Oval. 

Collie also hosts the Collie Motorplex, one of Western Australia's few permanent motorsport venues outside the Perth metropolitan area.

The Coalfields Museum and Historical Research Centre provides a glimpse of the history and development of the mining town of Collie.

Geography

Climate
Collie experiences a Mediterranean climate with hot, dry summers and cool, wet winters (Köppen climate classification Csb).
The town was lashed with unseasonal storms on 12 December 2012 resulting in some flooding in the town. The town received  of rain in a 12-hour period; several houses were evacuated.

Gallery

References

External links

 
Towns in Western Australia
Mining towns in Western Australia
Coal mining in Western Australia
Shire of Collie